Podhum is a village in the municipality of Tuzi, Montenegro. It is located just north of Lake Skadar.

Demographics
According to the 2011 census, its population was 253.

References

Populated places in Tuzi Municipality
Albanian communities in Montenegro